Erin is the ancient Irish name for Ireland and is a common given name.

Erin may also refer to:

Places

Canada 

 Erin, Ontario, in Wellington County

France 

 Érin, a commune in the département of Pas-de-Calais

Isle of Man 

 Port Erin, a town

United States 

 Erin, New York, a town in Chemung County
 Erin (CDP), New York, a census-designated place in the center of the town of Erin
 Erin, Tennessee, a city in Houston County
 Erin, Jasper County, Texas
 Erin, Wisconsin
 Erin Lake, a lake in Minnesota

Music
 Erin Anttila (born 1977), Finnish singer known by mononym Erin
 "Erin", song by English guitarist Albert Lee

Other
 Erin (Front Royal, Virginia), an historic home listed on the National Register of Historic Places in Virginia, United States
 Erin, a food brand owned by Valeo Foods
 Erin, a game by Alternative Armies based on the Invasion Cycle Myths of Celtic Ireland
 , a battleship of the Royal Navy
 Hurricane Erin, any of several hurricanes
 Erin (color), a shade of green

See also
 Aaron (disambiguation), male given name with a similar pronunciation
 Eren, Turkish name